= Stephen Shuster =

American biologist

Stephen M. Shuster is an American biologist currently Professor of Invertebrate Zoology at Northern Arizona University and an Elected Fellow of the American Association for the Advancement of Science.

== Education ==
He earned his Ph.D. at University of California, Berkeley in 1987.

== Research ==
His interests are human and animal reproduction and marine organisms evolution and population. His highest cited paper is Mating systems and strategies at 1680 times, according to Google Scholar.

== Publications ==
- Shuster, S. M. 2014. Why males and females look different. Evolution.
- Ikeda, D. H., K. C. Grady, S. M. Shuster and T. G. Whitham. 2014. Incorporating climate change and exotic species into forecasts of riparian forest distribution. PLosOne 9: 1–12.
- Shuster, S. M., S. J. Embry, C. R. Hargis, and A. Nimer. 2014. The inheritance of autosomal and sex-linked cuticular pigmentation patterns in the marine isopod, Paracerceis sculpta Holmes, 1904 (Isopoda: Sphaeromatidae). Journal of Crustacean Biology 34(4): 460–466.
- Bleakley, B. H., S. M. Welter, K. McCauley-Cole, S. M. Shuster, and A. J. Moore. 2013. Cannibalism as an interacting phenotype: Pre-cannibalistic aggression is influenced by social partners in the endangered Socorro Isopod (Thermosphaeroma thermophilum). Journal of Evolutionary Biology
- Shuster, S. M., W. R. Briggs and P. A. Dennis. 2013. How multiple mating by females affects sexual selection. Philosophical Transactions of the Royal Society B 368 (1613): 20120046.
